Abel Kitchin or "Kitchen" (died 1639) was an English merchant and Mayor of Bristol.

He lived in Broad Street. Kitchin was Mayor of Bristol from 1612 to 1613.

Anne of Denmark went to Bristol on 4 June 1613 during her progress to Bath. Kitchin and the town council organised various entertainments. They met the queen at Lawford or Lafford's Gate, and Kitchin gave her a satin purse embroidered with the initials "AR".

A seat was built for her at Canon's Marsh near the Cathedral, where on 7 June she watched a staged battle at the confluence of the Avon and Frome, fought between an English ship and two Turkish galleys. After the victory, some Turkish prisoners were presented to her and she laughed at this, saying both the actors' red costumes and their "countenances" were like the Turks. The entertainment at Bristol was described in verse by Robert Naile, who mentions the Turks were played by sailors, "worthy brutes, who oft have seen their habit, form and guise", who were made to kneel before Anne of Denmark and beg for mercy as the final act of the pageant.

That evening, the queen's lady in waiting Jean Drummond and others had dinner with Abel Kitchin, and gave him a ring from the queen, set with diamonds. On 8 June Kitchen escorted her to Lafford's Gate and she went to Siston Court.

In his will, Kitchin bequeathed the queen's ring to posterity in his son Abel's family.

Family
His children included;
 Abel Kitchin
 John Kitchin
 Mary Kithchin, who married Nicholas Meredith
 Sara Kitchin

References

17th-century English people
History of Bristol